The 2013–14 Sam Houston State Bearkats men's basketball team represented Sam Houston State University during the 2013–14 NCAA Division I men's basketball season. The Bearkats, led by fourth year head coach Jason Hooten, played their home games at the Bernard Johnson Coliseum and were members of the Southland Conference. They finished the season 24–11, 13–5 in Southland play to finish in third place. They advanced to the championship game of the Southland Conference tournament where they lost to Stephen F. Austin. They were invited to the CollegeInsider.com Tournament where they defeated Alabama State in the first round before losing in the second round to San Diego.

Roster

Schedule

|-
!colspan=9 style="background:#FF7F00; color:#FFFFFF;"| Regular season

|-
!colspan=9 style="background:#FF7F00; color:#FFFFFF;"| Southland tournament

|-
!colspan=9 style="background:#FF7F00; color:#FFFFFF;"| CIT

References

Sam Houston Bearkats men's basketball seasons
Sam Houston State
Sam Houston State
Sam Houston State Bearkats basketball
Sam Houston State Bearkats basketball